The 2008 Korean FA Cup Final was a football match played on 21 December 2008 at Jeju Stadium in Jeju City that decided the winner of the 2008 season of the Korean FA Cup. The 2008 final was the culmination of the 13th season of the tournament.

The final was contested by Gyeongnam FC and Pohang Steelers. The match kicked off at 13:25 KST. The referee for the match was Choi Kwang-Bo.

Road to the final

Gyeongnam FC

1Gyeongnam's goals always recorded first.

Pohang Steelers

1Pohang's goals always recorded first.

Match details

See also
2008 Korean FA Cup

References

External links

2008
FA
Korean FA Cup Final 2008
Korean FA Cup Final 2008